Mariela Cespedes (born 13 November 1993) is a Dominican team handball player. She plays for the club Maquiteria, and on the Dominican Republic national team. She competed at the 2013 World Women's Handball Championship in Serbia, where the Dominican Republic placed 23rd.

References

1993 births
Living people
Dominican Republic female handball players
Pan American Games medalists in handball
Pan American Games bronze medalists for the Dominican Republic
Handball players at the 2011 Pan American Games
Medalists at the 2011 Pan American Games